Love! Valour! Compassion! is a play by Terrence McNally. The play opened Off-Broadway in 1994 and transferred to Broadway in 1995. It won the Tony Award for Best Play and the Drama Desk Award for Outstanding Play.

Productions
Love! Valour! Compassion! premiered Off-Broadway at the Manhattan Theatre Club on October 11, 1994, running for 72 performances. The production transferred to Broadway to the Walter Kerr Theatre on February 14, 1995, and closed on September 17, 1995, after 248 performances and 28 previews. Directed by Joe Mantello, the cast featured Nathan Lane (Buzz Hauser), John Glover (John and James Jeckyll), Stephen Bogardus (Gregory Mitchell), John Benjamin Hickey (Arthur Pape), Anthony Heald (Perry Sellars), Justin Kirk (Bobby), and Randy Becker (Ramon Fornos).

The play was produced and directed by Stephen Henry at the Edinburgh Festival Fringe and won The Stage Awards for Best Actor (Chris Pickles) and Best Ensemble. This production then ran in London at the Tristan Bates Theatre in October 1998.

Plot
The setting is at a lakeside summer vacation house in Dutchess County, two hours north of New York City where eight gay friends spend the three major holiday weekends of one summer together for Memorial Day, Independence Day, and Labor Day. The house belongs to Gregory, a successful Broadway choreographer now approaching middle age, who fears he is losing his creativity; and his twenty-something lover, Bobby, a legal assistant who is blind. Each of the guests at their house is connected to Gregory’s work in one way or another – Arthur and longtime partner Perry are business consultants; John Jeckyll, a sour Englishman, is a dance accompanist; die-hard musical theater fanatic Buzz Hauser is a costume designer and the most stereotypically gay man in the group. Only John's summer lover, Ramon, and John's twin brother James are outside the circle of friends. But Ramon is outgoing and eventually makes a place for himself in the group, and James is such a gentle soul that he is quickly welcomed.

Critical response
Vincent Canby, in his review for The New York Times, wrote: "...it's utterly contemporary; its one-liners are sometimes hysterical and are slammed home with style, most often by the incomparable Nathan Lane; it has genuine pathos that's only slightly tinged with sentimentality, and, as a singular talking point, it offers more male nudity than has probably ever been seen in a legitimate Broadway theater."

Analysis of characters

Gregory Mitchel 
Gregory Mitchell is a middle-aged man celebrated Broadway dancer and choreographer. Now, with most of his career behind him Gregory is struggling with creativity and himself to find the energy for his last work. Gregory hosts Memorial Day, Fourth of July, and Labor Day at his century-old country home called "Manderlay" for relaxation and some time away from the city. Gregory's main struggles in the play are his love for Bobby, Bobby's betrayal, and his attempt to complete a major piece of choreography for a world premiere in New York. When Christopher Wilson played the role of Gregory Mitchell, it is said he portrayed the character shy and verbally inexpressive.

Buzz Hauser 
Buzz, a musical comedy enthusiast, provides the play with some of its most humorous and touching moments. Buzz works making costumes for Gregory's companies and volunteers time at a local AIDS clinic, and he is a great lover of Broadway musicals. Buzz is the type of guy that is always constantly singing a broadway song on the way to work or trying to work in a quote into a conversation. Although he jokes about being bad with relationships and claims to be done with finding love, he eventually falls in love with John's brother, James, who also suffers from AIDS but tragically is in a more advanced stage of the disease.

Bobby Brahms 
Bobby is Gregory's boyfriend of four years. He is in his early twenties, which is much younger than Gregory. Despite the age difference, they share gentle demeanors, a passion for music, and a love for the natural surroundings at Gregory's house in the country. Blind since birth, Bobby does not let his handicap deter him, and he resists letting it define him.

James Jeckyll 
James is John Jeckyll’s twin brother and Buzz’s lover. James is witty, generous, and self-deprecating and seems to care deeply about everyone he meets. James provides Buzz a final chance at a meaningful relationship, even though it is one that they both know will soon end tragically by AIDS. However, in the brief time they have together, James manages to keep his optimism and give Buzz a new perspective on life.

Film adaptation 

In 1997, a film adaptation written by McNally reunited much of the original cast, with Jason Alexander and Stephen Spinella replacing Nathan Lane and Anthony Heald.

Original Broadway production

References

Further reading

External links
 
 
 

1994 plays
HIV/AIDS in theatre
Broadway plays
Drama Desk Award-winning plays
LGBT-related plays
Plays by Terrence McNally
Tony Award-winning plays
Obie Award-winning plays
New York (state) in fiction
American plays adapted into films